Jean-Claude Marty (8 August 1943 – 17 January 2023) was a French rugby league player who played as a winger.

Marty played for FC Lézignan XIII, with whom he won the Coupe de France Lord Derby in 1966 and 1970 and Racing Club Albi XIII, with whom he won again in 1974. He played in 13 games for the French national team from 1965 to 1974.

References

1943 births
2023 deaths
France national rugby league team players
People from Carcassonne
Rugby league wingers